Acerentomon doderoi was the first proturan species to be described. The specimen was collected by Agostino Dodero and named after him by Italian entomologist Filippo Silvestri in 1907.

References

Protura
Animals described in 1907
Taxa named by Filippo Silvestri